The 1975 eruption of Mauna Loa was a short-lived Hawaiian eruption that followed 25 years of quiescence at the Hawaiian volcano Mauna Loa. The eruption began just before midnight on July 5 and involved fissures extending across the length of Moku‘āweoweo, Mauna Loa's summit caldera, and into the upper ends of the volcano's northeast and southwest rift zones. After only 6 hours, activity in Moku‘āweoweo and on the southwest rift zone ended, but lava fountaining continued along the northeast rift zone until 7:30 p.m. on July 6, when all activity ceased.

Precursors
No unusual activity was noted on the Mauna Loa seismograms during the early evening of July 5; seismicity was at relatively low levels. At 23:18 HST, however, seismic alarms, signifying prolonged high-amplitude volcanic tremor, were activated in homes of Hawaiian Volcano Observatory (HVO) staff. The tremor had been first recorded by three seismometers near Moku‘āweoweo at 22:51 HST. Staff reached HVO at 23:30 HST and saw that harmonic tremor was being recorded on all Mauna Loa and Kīlauea seismographs. Hawaiʻi Volcanoes National Park and civil defense authorities were alerted to the imminent probability of a Mauna Loa eruption.

Eruption
At 23:42 HST, a small glow was noted above the southwest end of Moku‘āweoweo. Lava flows were rapidly advancing to the west and southwest from the southwest rift zone vents.

The eruptive fissures extended rapidly northeastward, across North Pit, and into the upper northeast rift zone at 02:25 HST. At 02:45 HST lava from the North Pit vents began cascading into another summit pit crater, Lua Poholo. By 03:15 HST, the lava fountains on the southwest rift zone and within Moku‘āweoweo were waning, and the lava flows moving to the west and southwest had stagnated. Fountains continued to migrate eastward along the northeast rift zone, but by dawn eruptive activity was largely restricted to echelon vents near the northeast rift zone at  elevation.

A voluminous a'a flow moved about  down the north flank of Mauna Loa and threatened to cut the paved access road and powerlines to the Mauna Loa Observatory. Fountaining continued at greatly diminished levels throughout the day, but ceased by nightfall.

References

Mauna Loa
20th-century volcanic events
1975 in Hawaii
July 1975 events in the United States
VEI-0 eruptions
Volcanic eruptions in the United States
Hawaiian eruptions